Arthur Berry may refer to:

 Arthur Berry (playwright) (1925–1994), English playwright, poet, teacher and artist
 Arthur Berry (footballer) (1888–1953), English amateur footballer
 Arthur Massey Berry (1888–1970), Canadian bush pilot
 Arthur Berry (politician) (1879–1943), politician in Manitoba, Canada
 Arthur Berry (cricketer) (1928–2016), New Zealand cricketer